Apnenik pri Boštanju is a settlement to the west of Boštanj in the Municipality of Sevnica in central Slovenia. The area is part of the historical region of Lower Carniola. The municipality is now included in the Lower Sava Statistical Region.

Name
The name of the settlement was changed from Apnenik to Apnenik pri Boštanju in 1953. In the past the German name was Kalchberg.

History
The remains of medieval Sawenstein Castle can be found on Vetrnik Hill to west of the settlement. It was first mentioned in written documents dating to the 12th century, but was likely built in the 11th century. It was abandoned in the 17th century.

References

External links
Apnenik pri Boštanju at Geopedia

Populated places in the Municipality of Sevnica